Etlingera elatior (also known as torch ginger, ginger flower, red ginger lily, torch lily, wild ginger, combrang, kecombrang, bunga kantan, Philippine wax flower, ගොඩ ඕලු (goda olu), ගොඩ නෙලුම් (goda nelum), සිද්ධාර්ථ (siddartha),  火炬姜, Indonesian tall ginger, boca de dragón, rose de porcelaine, and porcelain rose) is a species of herbaceous perennial plant in the family Zingiberaceae; it is native to Thailand, Malesia and New Guinea. 

The showy pink flowers are used in decorative arrangements, and are an important ingredient across Southeast Asia.

Description 
The species grows as a pseudostem from a rhizome; it takes about 18-22 days for the first leaf to grow from the rhizome. The leafy shoot lasts for about 70 days and may reach a height of 3-4 metres.

Flower 
The flower bud appears from the shoot after 30 days, it swells gradually and turns pink before blooming after more than 50 days. The inflorescence is made of 20-25
layers of floral bracts and 3-4 layers of involuntary bracts at full bloom; it may have 90-120 true flowers inside.

Chemistry 
From the leaves of E. elatior, three caffeoylquinic acids, including chlorogenic acid (CGA), as well as three flavonoids quercitrin, isoquercitrin and catechin, have been isolated. Content of CGA was significantly higher than flowers of Lonicera japonica (Japanese honeysuckle), the commercial source.

A protocol for producing a standardized herbal extract of CGA from leaves of E. elatior (40%) has been developed, compared to commercial CGA extracts from honeysuckle flowers (25%).

Use 
In North Sumatra (especially among the Karo people), the flower buds are used for a stewed fish dish called Arsik ikan mas (Andaliman/Sichuan pepper-spiced carp). In Bali, people use the white part of the bottom part of the trunk for cooking chilli sauce called "Sambal Bongkot", and use the flower buds to make chilli sauce called "Sambal Kecicang".

In Thailand, it is eaten in a kind of Thai salad preparation. In Malaysia, the flower is an essential ingredient in cooking the fish broth for a kind of spicy sour noodle soup called "Asam Laksa" (AKA "Penang Laksa"), in the preparation of a kind of salad called Kerabu and many other Malay dishes. The fruit is also used in Indonesian cooking.

In Karo, it is known as asam cekala (asam meaning 'sour'), and the flower buds, but more importantly the ripe seed pods, which are packed with small black seeds, are an essential ingredient of the Karo version of sayur asam, and are particularly suited to cooking fresh fish. In Sundanese, it is known as Honje.

Gallery

Similar species 
 Alpinia galanga 
 Curcuma longa 
 Etlingera fulgens
 Etlingera maingayi 
 Kaempferia galanga,

See also 
Domesticated plants and animals of Austronesia

References

elatior
Taxa named by Rosemary Margaret Smith